Ian James Marsden (born 25 January 1972 in Stafford) is a British paracanoeist, hand cyclist and was previously a champion powerlifter. He bronze medalled at the 2016 Summer Paralympics in the Men's KL1 200m.

Personal life 
Marsden began his professional life as a microbiologist.

Sporting career

Powerlifting 
Before sustaining a spinal injury, Marsden competed as a non-disabled athlete at the British Open Powerlifting Championships, and titled in 1989 when he was 17. He holds 3 world records.

Handcycling 
After the spinal injury, he became the "first British male to win a podium position" on the European Handcycling Circuit (EHC).

Shooting 
In the 10m air rifle category, Marsden won a silver and bronze medal at world level. He was due to compete in London 2012, but health complications prevented this.

Paracanoe 
Marsden has mentioned that he was asked numerous times if he wanted to try Paracanoe (during his handcycling career and shooting). He took up the offer of regular training at Nottingham and joined the Paracanoe GB Sprint Team, representing Team Great Britain since 2013. He bronze medalled at the Rio 2016 Paralympic Games.

Injury 
Marsden sustained a spinal injury powerlifting, which caused his hospitalisation and eventually introducing him to the world of handcycling. However, after competing on the European circuit for a number of years, Marsden was once again hospitalised, and it was discovered that he had a rare motor neuron condition.

References

1972 births
Living people
Sportspeople from Stafford
British powerlifters
British male cyclists
British male sport shooters
British male canoeists
Paracanoeists of Great Britain
Paralympic medalists in paracanoe
Paralympic bronze medalists for Great Britain
Paracanoeists at the 2016 Summer Paralympics
Medalists at the 2016 Summer Paralympics
Paracanoeists at the 2020 Summer Paralympics
ICF Canoe Sprint World Championships medalists in paracanoe